The Augustus M. Garrison House is a historic house located in Texarkana, Arkansas.

Description and history 
Built in 1895, the -story, wood-frame house is notable as one of the city's finest turn-of-the-century Queen Anne style houses. It features the irregular massing, typical of the style, with a single-story wraparound porch with delicate spindled woodwork, and a three-story circular tower topped by a conical roof. The house was built by Augustus M. Garrison, a lawyer, and remained in his family into the 21st century.

The house was listed on the National Register of Historic Places on March 25, 1982. It currently functions as part of the House of Wadley Bed and Breakfast Inn.

See also
J.K. Wadley House, also part of the Wadley B&B, 618 Pecan Street
National Register of Historic Places listings in Miller County, Arkansas

References

External links
House of Wadley B&B

Houses on the National Register of Historic Places in Arkansas
Queen Anne architecture in Arkansas
Houses completed in 1895
Houses in Miller County, Arkansas
National Register of Historic Places in Miller County, Arkansas
Buildings and structures in Texarkana, Arkansas